Carlton is a census-designated place (CDP) in Missoula County, Montana, United States. The population was 694 at the 2010 census.

The Florence-Carlton School District educates students from kindergarten through 12th grade. It is located in Florence.

Demographics

References

Census-designated places in Missoula County, Montana
Census-designated places in Montana